Agrotis fatidica is a moth of the family Noctuidae. It is found in Southern and Central Europe, east through Russia to Mongolia, China and Tibet.

The wingspan is about 40 mm. Adults are on wing from July to August depending on the location.

The larvae feed on Poaceae species.

Subspecies
Agrotis fatidica fatidica (Europe, Russian plains, mountains of north-eastern Siberia, South Siberian Mountains, Central Yakutian Lowland, Kazakhstan and Mongolia)
Agrotis fatidica trifurcula (South Siberian Mountains and Central Yakutian Lowland)
Agrotis fatidica bombycina (Siberia, Mongolia, China)

References

External links

 Lepforum.de
 Noctuidae.de

Agrotis
Moths of Europe
Moths of Asia
Moths described in 1824
Taxa named by Jacob Hübner